Royal Danish Navy ship of the line HDMS Tordenskjold was commissioned in 1854. The Tordenskjold was constructed in response to the perceived danger posed by the German nations to Denmark's status as a major naval force in the Baltic. It was named after the celebrated Danish naval hero Peter Tordenskjold.

Construction and career
The Tordenskjold was a three-decked ship of the line with a displacement of around 2,500 tons that was constructed in Copenhagen. She was launched on 16 June 1852 at the Nyholm shipyard. The vessel was armed with 74 cannons and had a crew of 550 sailors. The Tordenskjold was one of the era's largest and most formidable warships.

During the Danish-German War of 1864, the Tordenskjold saw considerable duty and played a significant part in the Battle of Heligoland. During the First Schleswig War, the Tordenskjold contributed to retain Danish sovereignty over the waterways of the Baltic. In both wars, the Tordenskjold displayed superior firepower and played a crucial part in Danish naval victory. 

Despite her massive size and tremendous weaponry, the Tordenskjold was decommissioned in 1872 as Denmark shifted toward more modern naval warships. After nearly four decades of service, the Tordenskjold was then sold and used as a merchant vessel until it was lost in the Atlantic in 1892. Today, the Tordenskjold is regarded as one of Denmark's finest naval battleships and a symbol of the nation's maritime power in the 19th century.

See also

 Lists of ships of the Royal Danish Navy
 HMS Victory
 HSwMS Stockholm
USS Constitution

References

Ships built in Denmark
1852 ships
Steam frigates
Ships of the Royal Danish Navy
Frigates of the Royal Danish Navy